Vinayak Janardan Karandikar (September 15, 1872 – March 30, 1909) was a major poet of the Marathi language of India. He is considered part of the early twentieth century renaissance in literature and poetry of the Marathi Language in the Indian state of Maharashtra due to his contribution to the revival of ancient poetry forms from Yadava Dynasty Maharashtra.

References

Marathi-language poets
1872 births
1909 deaths
19th-century Indian poets
Indian male poets
Poets from Maharashtra
19th-century Indian male writers